QuakeSim is a NASA project for modeling earthquake fault systems. It was started in 2001 with NASA funding as a follow up to the General Earthquake Models (GEM) initiative. The multi-scale nature of earthquakes requires integrating data types and models to fully simulate and understand the earthquake process. QuakeSim is a computational framework for modeling and understanding earthquake and tectonic processes.

QuakeSim focuses on modeling interseismic process though various boundary element, finite element, and analytical applications, which run on various platforms, including desktop and high-end computers. The QuakeTables database allows for modelers to access geological and geophysical data.  A goal of QuakeSim is to develop significant improvements in earthquake forecast quality, thereby mitigating the danger from this natural hazard.

QuakeSim Portal 
The QuakeSim Portal allows for users to access and ingest data into models and simulations.  It provides the computational infrastructure for the entire project. QuakeSim users can create an account and interact with different data and software through the portal. The QuakeSim Portal consists of portlets that include:

Facilities for accessing real-time and archival GPS data
Time series analysis tools, including ST_Filter and RDAHMM
Mesh generation and viscoelastic finite element simulation tools (GeoFEST)
Okada-based elastic fault modeling methods (Disloc, which is a forward model, and Simplex for inverting geodetic data).

QuakeTables 
QuakeTables is the database used to access information for QuakeSim.  Information found in the QuakeTables includes:

Paleoseismic fault data
Global Positioning System (GPS) surface deformation data
Seismicity data
Processed Interferometric Synthetic Aperture Radar (InSAR) Interferograms from existing satellites

This information plays a big role in the process of forecasting and damage mitigation.  The information allows for the creation of simulations and data mining.  This then improves the prediction for potential earthquakes.  This, along with attenuation modeling and site effects, leads to a better understanding of probable ground motion, allowing for the opportunity to improve structural response.

Developed Software 
QuakeSim includes several applications. GeoFEST, PARK, and Virtual California are used to model different aspects of the earthquake cycle.

QuakeSim-related NASA missions 
QuakeSim utilizes GPS data from NASA, the National Science Foundation, and the US Geological Survey Southern California Integrated GPS Network (SCIGN). QuakeSim was also establishing the computational infrastructure for the planned NASA DESDynI (Deformation, Ecosystem Structure, and Dynamics of Ice) mission, which was cancelled in 2012.
DESDynI (pronounced destiny) would fly InSAR and LIDAR instruments for studying hazards and global environmental change.

Affiliates 
 NASA Jet Propulsion Laboratory (lead)
 Brown University
 Indiana University
 NASA Ames
 University of California, Davis
 University of California, Irvine
 University of Southern California

References

 
 
 
 DESDynI: Deformation, Ecosystem Structure, and Dynamics of Ice Monitoring Hazards And Environmental Changes From Space. (2007). [Brochure] Jet Propulsion Laboratory: Author.
 InSAR: Interferometric Synthetic Aperture Radar. (2006). [Brochure] Jet Propulsion Laboratory: Author.

External links
QuakeTables
QuakeSim Portal
QuakeSim.org
desdyni.org
The QUAKESIM Fault Database for California, abstract
Josh Chamot, Earthquake warning tools, Geotimes (American Geological Institute), October 2003, accessed August 16, 2007
Siegel, H.; Li, P., MSLT, Multi Surface Light Table, a Tool for Viewing Faults Under Their Terrain, American Geophysical Union, Fall Meeting 2003, abstract #S51B-06
Kristen Cole, Tiny California town is the focus of geologist’s effort to predict quakes, George Street Journal. July 11, 2003, accessed August 16, 2007

Seismology measurement